Jiang shan mei ren can refer to:

 The Kingdom and the Beauty, a 1959 Hong Kong film
 An Empress and the Warriors, a 2008 Hong Kong film